Eugene Ehrlich (21 May 1922 – 5 April 2008) was a lexicographer and author.

He was a member of the Department of English and Comparative Literature at Columbia University, where he taught in the Department of General Studies.  A reading specialist, he prepared generations of adult students for the rigors of university work after years of absence from any academic setting.  His books about language are very well regarded for their clarity and humor and were introduced by such word luminaries as William F. Buckley, Richard Lederer, and Noah Adams, who also featured Mr. Ehrlich's language commentary on his public radio broadcasts.  William Safire occasionally cited Mr. Ehrlich in his writing on language.

He was quoted as saying that his higher mission was "being the antidote to the 'effects wrought by the forces of linguistic darkness.'”

Biography
Eugene Ehrlich was born in New York City in 1922. He attended CCNY before service in the United States Army during World War II.  Trained to interrogate prisoners in Europe at the Army's language school at Boston College, as well as eight weeks of training at Camp Ritchie he was reassigned to the Pacific suddenly because events in France were developing too rapidly.  He received crash training in Japanese, which he used in the Philippines, New Guinea, and occupied Japan.  After the War, he did graduate work at Columbia Teachers College, taught at Fairleigh Dickinson University, and began work as a consultant to industry at Bell Laboratories, where his precise use of language helped scientists and engineers describe and communicate their discoveries.  He later worked at Norden Aircraft, Sikorsky, Loral Aerospace and many others where he helped prepare contract proposals for vast government contracts.

He married Norma Solway in 1948. He has 4 children: Anne Ehrlich physician, Henry Ehrlich writer, Richard Ehrlich writer, and Jonathan Ehrlich attorney. He has 10 grandchildren.  Eugene Ehrlich died on April 5, 2008, at home in Mamaroneck, New York

Books by Ehrlich 

This list is incomplete.

 The Highly Selective Dictionary for the Extraordinarily Literate
 The Highly Selective Thesaurus for the Extraordinarily Literate (1994)
 The Highly Selective Dictionary of Golden Adjectives for the Extraordinarily Literate
 The International Thesaurus of Quotations
 Choose the Right Word
 Amo, Amas, Amat and More
 Les Bons Mots: How to Amaze Tout le Monde with Everyday French
 The Art of Technical Writing
 How to Study Better and Get Higher Marks
 Oxford American Dictionary
 Veni, Vidi, Vici: Conquer Your Enemies, Impress Your Friends with Everyday Latin 
 NBC Handbook of Pronunciation
 Writing and researching term papers and reports: A new guide for students 
 What's in a Name?: How Proper Names Became Everyday Words
 Collins Gem Thesaurus

References 

 Eugene Ehrlich, 85, Word Connoisseur, Dies (Douglas Martin, New York Times, 15 April 2008)

External links

American lexicographers
1922 births
2008 deaths
Ritchie Boys
20th-century lexicographers